List of prime ministers of Laos may refer to:
 Prime Minister of the Kingdom of Laos, an office and state that existed between 1941 and 1975.
 Prime Minister of Laos, officially the Prime Minister of the Lao People's Democratic Republic is an office and state that has existed since 1975.